Xu Guixiang (born 27 December 1959), better known by his pen name Chǔ Chūnqiū, is a Chinese novelist. Xu was a member of the 7th, 8th, 12th National Committee of the Chinese People's Political Consultative Conference.

Biography
Xu was born in Huoqiu County, Anhui in December 1959. In 1978, Xu left Anhui to Henan, he was drafted into the People's Liberation Army and served for 16 years.

Xu graduated from People's Liberation Army Arts College in 1991, where he majored in literature.

In 1994, Xu was transferred to People's Liberation Army Publishing House. Xu joined the China Writers Association in 1998.

Works

Novellas
 Scarless Bullet
 Easy to March
 Decisive Battle

Novels
 Elevation
 Heaven of History
 Height

Awards
 Heaven of History – 6th Mao Dun Literature Prize (2005)

References

1959 births
Writers from Anhui
People from Huoqiu County
Living people
Mao Dun Literature Prize laureates
Chinese male novelists